Mix in  may refer to:

 A mix-in is some type of confectionery added to ice cream
 Mixin is a class in object-oriented programming languages